This is a list of international football matches of the Switzerland national football team from 1905 until 1918.

Between their first match in 1905 and 1918, Switzerland played in 29 matches, resulting in 6 victories, 3 draws and 20 defeats. Switzerland made steady progress from early 9–0 defeats to England amateurs and Hungary, managing to comfortably beat Germany (5–3) in 1908, and France (5–2) and Italy (3–0) in 1911. A notable figure during these years was Paul Wyss, who become the nation's all-time top scorer with 8 goals before being overtaken by several of his contemporaries.

Results

1905

1908

1909

1910

1911

1912

1913

1914

1915

1917

1918

See also
 Switzerland national football team
Switzerland national football team results (2010–2019)
Switzerland national football team results (2020–present)

References

External links
Results at RSSSF 

1900s in Switzerland
1910s in Switzerland